Franck David (born 21 March 1970 in Paris) is a French windsurfer who competed in the 1992 Summer Olympics in Barcelona, where he won the gold medal in the Men's Lechner Sailboard Class. He also became World Champion in 1992.

References

External links
 
 
 

1970 births
Living people
French windsurfers
French male sailors (sport)
Olympic sailors of France
Olympic gold medalists for France
Olympic medalists in sailing
Sailors at the 1992 Summer Olympics – Lechner A-390
Medalists at the 1992 Summer Olympics
Mediterranean Games gold medalists for France
Sportspeople from Paris
20th-century French people